Laprairie may refer to former spellings of "La Prairie" in the context of Quebec geographical names, including:
 La Prairie (provincial electoral district), a provincial electoral district in Quebec that was named "Laprairie" until 1988.
 La Prairie (electoral district), a former federal electoral district in Quebec abolished in 1997, which was named "Laprairie" until 1980.
 Châteauguay-Laprairie, a former provincial electoral district in Quebec
 Napierville-Laprairie, a former provincial electoral district in Quebec
 Beauharnois—Laprairie, a former federal electoral district in Quebec
 Châteauguay—Huntingdon—Laprairie, a former federal electoral district in Quebec
 Laprairie—Napierville, a former federal electoral district in Quebec
 Sainte-Catherine-d'Alexandrie-de-Laprairie, a former name of the city of Sainte-Catherine, Quebec prior to 1973
 Saint-Isidore-Laprairie, a former name of the Saint-Isidore-de-La Prairie post office in Canada
 Saint-Mathieu-de-Laprairie, a former name of the Saint-Mathieu-de-La Prairie post office in Canada

See also
 La Prairie, Quebec, a city in Quebec